Mark Magennis (born 15 March 1983 in Northern Ireland) is a Northern Irish retired footballer.  He played in the Football League with Carlisle United and was a Northern Ireland youth international.

References

1983 births
Living people
Association footballers from Northern Ireland
Association football midfielders
Association football wingers
Ballymena United F.C. players
Bangor F.C. players
Carlisle United F.C. players
Limavady United F.C. players
Dungannon Swifts F.C. players
Linfield F.C. players
Coventry City F.C. players
Northern Ireland youth international footballers